The Wilmington Quicksteps (also known as the Quickstep Club of Wilmington) were an 1884 late-season replacement baseball team in the Union Association. They finished with a 2-16 record and were managed by Joe Simmons. The team played their home games in Union Street Park in Wilmington, Delaware.

The ballpark was located on the southwest corner of Union Street and Front Street (now Lancaster Avenue), which at the time was just outside the city limits.[Ballparks of North America, Michael Benson, McFarland Publishing, 1989, p.413] The ballpark's life extended well beyond 1884, hosting minor league games until the 1910s.

In 1883, the Inter-State Association of Professional Baseball Clubs was founded, and local capital was invested for a franchise in Wilmington.

In 1884, The Interstate Association re-organized under the name "Eastern League" (not to be confused with the double A Eastern League of today); this was one of the first "minor leagues" and is considered a forerunner of today's AAA International League.The Wilmington Quicksteps quickly began to dominate the league, and so highly regarded was the club that major league clubs began to show up to play exhibition games; they defeated both the Washington Nationals and the Baltimore Monumentals during the season.

By August, the Quicksteps had already sewn up the league championship with a 50-12 record; unfortunately, their dominance nearly destroyed fan interest in the Eastern League, and even in Wilmington, attendance averaged only 400 per game.

Late into the season, Henry Lucas, the Union Association founder and owner of the St. Louis Maroons, convinced Simmons and the Quicksteps to cross over into his league after the Philadelphia Keystones folded. After winning their first game 4-3 over Washington on August 18, it was all downhill for the Quicksteps.

Many Wilmington players no longer felt bound by their contracts and signed for more money with other teams in their new league. Shortstop and team captain Oyster Burns jumped to the Baltimore Monumentals for $900 a month, followed by outfielder Dennis Casey for $700 a month, while Catcher Andy Cusick jumped to the Philadelphia Phillies for $375 a month; each had been making about $150 a month in Wilmington.

The only star player to remain in Wilmington was pitcher Ed "The Only" Nolan, who went on to beat Washington for Wilmington's second and last victory. But the Quicksteps could not survive the loss of Burns, Casey and Cusick, and the team finished with a meagre batting average of .175 in the Union Association. By this time, however, St. Louis had already won the pennant, so Wilmington's only perceivable purpose being to fill in the last month of the season.
 
Simmons pulled his team from the field during warm-ups prior to a game against the Kansas City Cowboys on September 21, 1884, having discovered that he would be unable to pay the $60 gate fee to the visiting Cowboys as the attendance was zero.

Wilmington subsequently dropped out of the Association and folded, being replaced in the Union Association by the Milwaukee Brewers.

1884 season

Season standings

Record vs. opponents

Roster

Player stats

Batting

Starters by position 
Note: Pos = Position; G = Games played; AB = At bats; H = Hits; Avg. = Batting average; HR = Home runs

Other batters 
Note: G = Games played; AB = At bats; H = Hits; Avg. = Batting average; HR = Home runs

Pitching

Starting pitchers 
Note: G = Games pitched; IP = Innings pitched; W = Wins; L = Losses; ERA = Earned run average; SO = Strikeouts

Relief pitchers 
Note: G = Games pitched; W = Wins; L = Losses; SV = Saves; ERA = Earned run average; SO = Strikeouts

External links
Wilmington Quicksteps Team Page at Baseball Reference
Wilmington UA game log
Delaware Baseball History
Sanborn map showing a portion of the ballpark, as of 1901

Notes
1. Park coordinates are approximately 39.746769, -75.574665

See also
Wilmington Blue Rocks
List of professional sports teams in Delaware

Union Association baseball teams
Defunct baseball teams in Delaware
Sports in Wilmington, Delaware
Baseball teams established in 1884
1884 establishments in Delaware
Baseball teams disestablished in 1884
1884 disestablishments in the United States